Ibrahim Khan II(reigned: 1689–1697; died 1701) was the last Subahdar of Bengal during the reign of emperor Aurangzeb.
His only child was a son Named Wazir Ibrahim Khan (1654–1713) and was diwan of Emperor Jahandar Shah. He was killed at the orders of Farrukhsiyar.

Early life
He was the eldest son of Ali Mardan Khan. Ali Mardan was a noble of Persian origin.  Prior to the governorship of Bengal, Ibrahim Khan served as Subahdar of Kashmir, Lahore and Bihar. He had a son named Zabardast Khan.

Reign
During his reign, English and French traders were granted several farmans to continue trading in Bengal. During 1695–1696, he failed to suppress the revolt of the Chandrakona zamindar, Shobha Singh. Later in 1697, Ibrahim Khan was replaced by emperor Aurangzeb's own grandson, Prince Azim-us-Shan.

See also
List of rulers of Bengal
History of Bengal
History of Bangladesh
History of India

References

Mughal nobility
Subahdars of Bengal
Subahdars of Kashmir
Subahdars of Lahore
Subahdars of Bihar